Three Little Kittens is a 2010 children's picture book of the classic nursery rhyme adapted by Jerry Pinkney.

Reception
Booklist'''s review of Three Little Kittens stated "Throughout, the sense of play is fun and contagious, the threat of punishment gentle but firm, and the rhyme limited yet effective.", and Horn Book Guide wrote "Young readers will get wrapped up in the light, relatable-to-kids dramatics.". School Library Journal described it as a "sumptuous edition" concluding "This is another superb entry in the artist's catalog of classics for a new generation." The Library Media Connection magazine called it "a must-have for cat people and Pinkney fans, and those who need an updated version of this tale."Three Little Kittens has also been reviewed by Kirkus Reviews, and Publishers Weekly''.

References

External links

Library holdings of Three Little Kittens

2010 children's books
American picture books
Fictional cats
Picture books by Jerry Pinkney
Books about cats
Works based on nursery rhymes
Dial Press books